Homogyne is a genus of flowering plants in the daisy family, Asteraceae.

 Species
 Homogyne alpina - Europe from Britain + Portugal to Ukraine 
 Homogyne ausserdorferi - Austria
 Homogyne discolor - Italy, Austria, Germany, Croatia, Slovenia, Bosnia-Herzegovina 
 Homogyne montana - Alps 
 Homogyne sylvestris - Italy, Austria, Croatia, Slovenia

References

External links
 

Senecioneae
Asteraceae genera
Flora of Europe
Taxa named by Henri Cassini